James Herbert Arthur Disney (8 December 1864 – 28 July 1943) was an Australian politician.

He was born in Ballarat West to carter and tailor Charles Disney and Sarah Darley. He left school at fourteen to become a boilermaker, and from around 1886 worked in Melbourne. On 22 April 1886 he married Isabella Christina Hill, with whom he had five children. He left Melbourne in 1889, finding difficulty due to his union connections. He spent time as a fruiterer and woodyard proprietor, and from around 1898 was a second-hand furniture dealer. He served on South Melbourne City Council from 1908 to 1918 and was mayor from 1915 to 1916. In 1916 he was elected to the Victorian Legislative Council as a Labor member, representing Melbourne West Province. He was a minister without portfolio from July to November 1924 and from 1927 to 1928. His son James was elected to the Council in 1940 for the United Australia Party. Disney continued to serve until his death at Fitzroy in 1943.

References

1864 births
1943 deaths
Australian Labor Party members of the Parliament of Victoria
Members of the Victorian Legislative Council